Bahhur (also spelled Behauwar or Bohur) is a village in northern Syria located northwest of Homs in the Homs Governorate. According to the Syria Central Bureau of Statistics, Bahhur had a population of 108 in the 2004 census. Its inhabitants are predominantly Greek Orthodox Christians.

References

Bibliography

 

Populated places in Homs District
Eastern Orthodox Christian communities in Syria